Harewood may refer to:

Places
 Harewood, West Yorkshire, a village and civil parish in the City of Leeds metropolitan borough, West Yorkshire, England
 Harewood (ward), an electoral ward of the Leeds City Council
 Harewood, British Columbia, Canada
 Harewood, Herefordshire, England
 Harewood, New Zealand, a suburb of Christchurch
 Harewood (West Virginia), a historic house near Charles Town, Jefferson County, West Virginia, U.S.
 Harewood, West Virginia, a settlement in Fayette County, West Virginia, United States

People
 Harewood (surname)
 Earl of Harewood

Other
 Harewood (material), wood that has been chemically treated to change its color
 Harewood Castle, near Leeds, England
 Harewood House, West Yorkshire
 Harewood Park, estate in Herefordshire, England, owned by the Duchy of Cornwall, tipped to be the future home of Prince William and Catherine Middleton
 Harewood speed Hillclimb